2011–12 season is the 10th Moldovan National Division season in the history of FC Dacia Chisinau.

Competitive games

Friendlies

Pre-season / First Half Season

Mid-season / Second Half Season

Super Cup

National Division

Matches

League table

Results summary

Results by round

Moldovan Cup

UEFA Champions League

Second qualifying round

Playing statistics 

Appearances (Apps.) numbers are for appearances in competitive games only.
Apps. numbers denote: "No. of games played (No. of games started / No. of games subbed on)"
Goal numbers are for goals during match time only and do not include goals from penalty shootouts.
Goal numbers denote: "No. of goals scored (No. of goals scored from penalty kick)"
If a player received two yellow cards in a match and was sent off the numbers count as two yellow cards, one red card.
Red card numbers denote: "No. of red cards (No. of second yellow cards / No. of straight red cards)"

Key: Po. = Playing position; GK = Goalkeeper; DF = Defender; MF = Midfielder; FW = Forward;
Updated to games played on 1 May 2012, match vs Olimpia.

Transfers and loans

Pre-season window

Mid-season window

References 

FC Dacia seasons
Dacia